Acetohydroxamic acid (also known as AHA or by the trade name Lithostat) is a drug that is a potent and irreversible enzyme inhibitor of the urease enzyme in various bacteria and plants; it is usually used for urinary tract infections. The molecule is similar to urea but is not hydrolyzable by urease; it thus disrupts the bacteria's metabolism through competitive inhibition.

Orphan drug

In 1983 the US Food and Drug Administration approved acetohydroxamic acid (AHA) as an orphan drug for "prevention of so-called struvite stones" under the newly enacted Orphan Drug Act of 1983. AHA cannot be patented because it is a standard chemical compound.

See also 
 Salicylhydroxamic acid

References 

Orphan drugs
Hydroxamic acids